Oak Run is a census-designated place and resort community in Persifer and Copley townships, Knox County, Illinois, United States. As of the 2010 census, its population was 547.

Description 

Oak Run is located three miles (5 km) north of U.S. Highway 150 between Knox County Highway 12 and Knox County Highway 15. The development surrounds the  Spoon Lake, the largest man-made body of water in Central Illinois. There is a golf course, convenience store, restaurant, and gas station as well as two marinas and several parks. Other facilities include a swimming pool, lounge building, tennis courts, beaches and a 56-site campground. The Oak Run area is maintained by the Oak Run rangers. There are both year round residents and vacation cottages located in Oak Run.

History 

Following the purchase of this acreage from 27 land owners, American Central commenced construction of Oak Run in 1971. Oak Run is situated in an area long referred to by area residents as "Round Bottom". The lake first reached pool elevation in 1973 and is fed by Sugar Creek and natural springs. The public Oak Run Golf Course opened in mid-summer of 1976.

Geography
Spoon Lake divides the town.

Demographics

References

External links
Oak Run community

Census-designated places in Illinois
Census-designated places in Knox County, Illinois
Populated places established in 1971
1971 establishments in Illinois